Independence is Kosheen's fourth studio album released on October 1, 2012. The digital copy of the album from iTunes includes two additional instrumentals, 'Zone 10' and 'Zone 15', as well as a remix of their single 'Spies' by Moth Equals.

Track listing

Independence - The Remixes

A limited edition compilation of 8 remixed songs from 'Independence' was released on the 9th of August 2013 by Kosheen.

References 

2012 albums
Kosheen albums